International Cricketer of the Year was an award given to the best player of the Australian summer cricket season, between 1979–80 and 1995–96.

The award was based on performances in tests and one day internationals. Because Australia almost always played more matches than visiting teams, points were "weighted" according to how many matches each team played. The prize often included a car.

Winners

References

Cricket awards and rankings
Australian sports trophies and awards